Harry Elliott "Blackjack" Smith (August 26, 1918 – July 30, 2013) was an American football player who anchored the line from the guard position on the University of Southern California's Rose Bowl teams in 1938 and 1939 seasons, and earned All-America honors each year.

College career
The 1938 team finished 9-2-0 and defeated Duke University. The next season, the Trojans finished 8-0-2 as national champions, including a 14-0 Rose Bowl conquest of the University of Tennessee. USC also defeated Notre Dame University in each of those seasons.  Smith was elected to the College Football Hall of Fame in 1955. Harry Smith also played for USC Rugby during his collegiate career.

Professional career
Following graduation, Smith played one year for the Detroit Lions in 1940.

Coaching career
He then served as an assistant coach at University of Missouri and USC before becoming head coach of the Canadian Football League's Saskatchewan Roughriders.

Death
In his last few years Smith had suffered a stroke that saw his health decline. He died in the morning on July 30, 2013 at Columbia, Missouri. He was 94.

References

External links
 NFL.com player page

1918 births
2013 deaths
All-American college football players
American football guards
Detroit Lions players
Missouri Tigers football coaches
Saskatchewan Roughriders coaches
Sportspeople from San Bernardino County, California
USC Trojans football coaches
USC Trojans football players
People from Cole County, Missouri
People from Ontario, California
Players of American football from California